Epalxiphora axenana, the brindled bell moth, is a species of moth of the family Tortricidae. It is endemic to New Zealand, where it has been recorded from the North Island only.

The forewings are whitish ochreous, mixed and clouded with brownish ochreous. The extreme costal edge is white. The hindwings are whitish, faintly mottled with pale grey towards the hindmargin. Adults have been recorded on wing from November to the beginning of January in one or more generations per year.

The larvae feed on Macropiper excelsum, Dysoxylum spectabile and Citrus species.

References

Moths described in 1881
Archipini
Moths of New Zealand
Taxa named by Edward Meyrick
Endemic fauna of New Zealand
Endemic moths of New Zealand